Ferdi Neita Sports Complex (sometimes Feride) is a multi-use stadium in Portmore, Jamaica.   It is currently used mostly for football matches and as a practising ground. It serves as a home ground of Portmore United F.C.  The stadium holds 3,000 people.

References

Football venues in Jamaica
Buildings and structures in Saint Catherine Parish